Oppikoppi was a music festival held in the Limpopo Province of South Africa, near the mining town of Northam. The festival started off focusing mostly on rock music, but gradually added more genres and now plays host to a complete mixed bag of genres. Anything from jazz, world music, house music, acoustic, comedy and all else in between can be heard on one of the multiple stages. Each year in the first week of August — except for 2017, when the festival was held in October — thousands of people used to flock to the farm to camp out in the bush and enjoy the music for several days. The festival features mostly South African bands, although international acts are included in the line-up.

Background
"Oppikoppi" was a colloquial abbreviation of the Afrikaans phrase "op die koppie", which literally means "on the hill". The festival derives its name from the resort on the piece of land where it is held, featuring a picturesque hill on top of which there is a bar and a small original stage. Once a year, the festival grounds were erected at the foot of that hill, where many simultaneous performances took place on the several stages. Beyond this were the camping grounds. A stage on a second hill usually featured dance acts and DJs.

History
The festival was first held in August 1995, with 27 local talents performing to a small crowd of enthusiasts. It has since grown substantially, with the addition of many new stages and thousands of people turning up each year. The festival is regarded by some as the primary influence in jump-starting the South African live music movement in the late 1990s. It attracts thousands of attendees annually.

According to the organizers they have "rolled bakkies, burnt tents, driven over knees, slept in jails, slept outside jails and turned over several stones to make gigs and festivals work."

In 2008, the Daily Mirror ranked OppiKoppi as the 4th best music festival in the world.

The festival has grown yearly, with 16 000 attendees and around 100 acts for both 2010 and 2011 and an estimated 20 000 attendees and 130 acts for 2012.

Acts and genres

The festival hosts a wide array of acts, with artists being booked from genres including, but not limited to: rock, hip hop, hardcore, punk, ska, folk, blues, drum 'n bass, big beats, funk, kwaito, jazz, traditional, world music, metal, indie and other genres.

In the past there had been smaller, more intimate gatherings on each Easter weekend in April and New Year's gatherings.

In 2012, Oppikoppi announced that it would be organising a festival in Cape Town called "One Night in Cape Town". One Night in Cape Town was organised again in 2013, and every year since.

Previous editions 

Oppikoppi is generally divided into three different strains of Oppikoppi: the main event in August, the Easter edition (which was discontinued after 2009) and miscellaneous events for various reasons. Regardless of the occasion, date and size of each event, they have all had different names and themes associated with them. The organisers took a "gap year" in 2019 following negative reviews of the 2018 edition. 2020 dates have not yet been announced.

See also

 In The City
 Music of South Africa
 Splashy Fen
 RAMFest

References

External links
Oppikoppi's Homepage
Oppikoppi 2006 review by Jackie Bischof, The Citizen, August 2006
Oppikoppi on Google Earth Community
Panoramic crowd photos taken from the stage during Oppikoppi 2012
About Oppikoppi Productions
Oppikoppi Productions Contact Details
Oppikoppi Productions News

Rock festivals in South Africa
Electronic music festivals in South Africa
Music festivals established in 1994